The International Criminal Court investigation in Afghanistan or the Situation in Afghanistan is an ongoing investigation by the International Criminal Court (ICC) into war crimes and crimes against humanity that are alleged to have occurred during the war in Afghanistan since 1 May 2003, or in the case of United States Armed Forces and the CIA, war crimes committed in Afghanistan, Poland, Romania or Lithuania. On 5 March 2020, the investigation was authorised to officially begin.

Investigation 
From 20 November 2017 to 31 January 2018, the ICC collected representations by victims in relation to their claims of crimes against humanity and war crimes committed by the Taliban and affiliated armed groups, war crimes by the Afghan National Security Forces, and war crimes committed in Afghanistan, Poland, Romania and Lithuania by United States Armed Forces and the United States Central Intelligence Agency (CIA). Information about allegations of crimes committed by other international military forces in Afghanistan was also sought.

In 2019, the request by Fatou Bensouda, the ICC chief prosecutor, to open an investigation was rejected at the pretrial level on the grounds that the chance of a successful prosecution was low, much time had passed, Afghan and US authorities were uncooperative, and the investigation wouldn't "serve the interests of justice". On 5 March 2020, after an appeal against the decision, the investigation was authorised to proceed. Judge Piotr Hofmański stated that the court has jurisdiction, since Afghanistan is party to the Rome Statute, and that the preliminary examination showed "reasonable grounds to believe that war crimes had been committed in Afghanistan".

Reactions 
In April 2019, the United States (US) cancelled Bensouda's visa in response to the ICC investigation in Afghanistan, on the grounds that the US does not wish claims of war crimes by US military personnel to be investigated by the ICC.

On 11 June 2020, US Secretary of State Mike Pompeo announced the signing of Executive Order 13928 by US President Donald Trump, establishing economic sanctions and visa travel restrictions against ICC lawyers and investigators as well as journalists providing evidence of war crimes by US citizens and military troops.
Pompeo claimed that the ICC is a kangaroo court.

On 2 September 2020, Bensouda and Phakiso Mochochoko, Head of the Jurisdiction, Complementarity and Cooperation Division of the ICC, had sanctions imposed on them by the United States in response to the ICC investigation in Afghanistan. Richard Dicker of Human Rights Watch criticised the imposition of sanctions, stating that they "[mark] a stunning perversion of US sanctions, devised to penalize rights abusers and kleptocrats, to persecute those tasked with prosecuting international crimes".

See also 
 Afghan Independent Human Rights Commission

References 

Afghanistan
War crimes in Afghanistan
War in Afghanistan (2001–2021)